Warmenhuizen (West Frisian: Wermehúze) is a town in the Dutch province of North Holland. It is a part of the municipality of Schagen, and lies about 8 km northwest of Heerhugowaard.
An agricultural community.  The area surrounding the town produces mainly dairy products, cabbage/potatoes, and hot house flowers.  Mainly a Roman Catholic community featuring two churches, an old Protestant one, fallen into disuse, built in 16th century and a more modern Roman Catholic church constructed in the early 20th century.

Warmenhuizen was a separate municipality until 1990, when it was merged with Harenkarspel. Harenkarspel merged with Schagen in 2013.

Notable people born in Warmenhuizen 
 Antje Paarlberg (1808-1885)
 Joop Klant (1915-1994)
 Jos Pronk (1983)
 Steven Rooks, cyclist

Gallery

References

Schagen
Former municipalities of North Holland
Populated places in North Holland